"Dip" is a song recorded by American rapper Tyga for his seventh studio album Legendary (2019). It was released on September 19, 2018, by Last Kings Records and Empire Distribution as the third single from the album. An alternate version of the song featuring rapper Nicki Minaj was released on October 29, 2018, along with an accompanying music video.

Music video
An accompanying music video for the remix version of the song was released on Tyga's YouTube and Vevo accounts on October 29, 2018. It was directed by Tyga and Arrad for Riveting Entertainment. The music video takes heavy influence from "Scream" by Michael Jackson and Janet Jackson.

Commercial performance
"Dip" debuted at number 83 on the Billboard Hot 100, becoming the 100th entry on the Hot 100 for Nicki Minaj. Minaj also became the fifth act to do so and the first female artist to achieve this feat. It moved 20 spots to number 63 the following week. On January 22, 2019, Dip was certified Gold By RIAA after selling 500,000 units in the United States of America. The certification is Tyga's third after "Taste" and "SWISH", prior to his 2019 album Legendary.

Track listing

Credits and personnel
Credits adapted from YouTube and BMI.
 Tyga − vocals
 Nicki Minaj − vocals
 D. A. Doman − production
 Christian "CQ" Quinonez − record engineering
 Jaycen Joshua − mixing

Charts

Certifications

Release history

Notes
The remix version was originally released as a Tyga song with a Nicki Minaj feature. However, after a few days, it changed to a Collaborative Track, where both artists were considered the main artists. It has since just been Tyga's song featuring Nicki Minaj, however it is counted as a Tyga & Nicki Minaj song on the Billboard Hot 100.

References

2018 singles
2018 songs
Nicki Minaj songs
Tyga songs
Songs written by Nicki Minaj
Songs written by Tyga
Empire Distribution singles
Songs written by D.A. Got That Dope